Arctodiaptomus michaeli is a species of copepod in the family Diaptomidae which is endemic to two lakes in Jammu and Kashmir, India.

References

Diaptomidae
Freshwater crustaceans of Asia
Fauna of Jammu and Kashmir
Taxonomy articles created by Polbot
Crustaceans described in 1990